The University of Cincinnati Clermont College (UC Clermont) is a satellite campus of the University of Cincinnati with its main campus in Batavia, Ohio. A satellite campus, UC East, opened in 2010. However, due to increased online enrollment the lease for UC East was discontinued in 2020.

UC Clermont is an open admissions institution, providing access to higher education to anyone with a high school diploma or equivalency. Clermont College's rolling admissions policy allows students to enroll any academic semester: autumn, spring or summer.

UC Clermont sponsors a variety of fine arts, including the Calico Children's Theatre and the Park National Bank Art Gallery. Additionally, the UC Clermont College Krueger Auditorium is also the home of the Clermont Philharmonic Orchestra.

History 

The college opened in 1972 and offers more than fifty associate degree and certificate programs and one bachelor's degree program.

In 2010 select programs at the Clermont campus moved to a new campus, known as UC East, located off of State Route 32 at the former Batavia Transmission plant, due to Clermont College's recent enrollment growth. However, due to prolonged declining enrollment at UC Clermont, UC East was closed and is vacated as of 2020.

Athletics
UC Clermont athletics teams are known as the "Cougars" and participate as a member of the United States Collegiate Athletic Association (USCAA) and the Ohio Collegiate Athletic Conference (OCAC). The college sponsors teams for men's and women's basketball, men's baseball, women's softball, men's and women's soccer, and women's volleyball.

Five USCAA National Championships
USCAA Men's Basketball Division II National Championship in 2007.
USCAA Men's Baseball Small College World Series in 2013.
USCAA Women's Basketball Division II National Championship in 2014.
USCAA Women's Soccer Division II National Championship in 2018.
USCAA Women's Soccer Division II National Championship in 2019.
USCAA Women's Volleyball Division II National Championship in 2021.

References

External links 

 

 
USCAA member institutions
Community colleges in Ohio
1972 establishments in Ohio

de:University of Cincinnati
es:Universidad de Cincinnati
fr:Université de Cincinnati
id:Universitas Cincinnati
it:Università di Cincinnati
ja:シンシナティ大学
no:University of Cincinnati
ksh:Universität va Cincinnati
fi:Cincinnatin yliopisto
sv:University of Cincinnati
ta:சின்சினாட்டி பல்கலைக்கழகம்
th:มหาวิทยาลัยซินซินแนติ
zh:辛辛纳提大學